Chilaquiles are a traditional Mexican breakfast dish consisting of corn tortillas cut into quarters and lightly fried.

Ingredients and variations 
Typically, corn tortillas cut into quarters and lightly fried or baked for a lighter version are the basis of the dish. Green or red salsa is poured over the crisp tortilla triangles. The mixture is simmered until the tortilla starts softening.  Pulled chicken is sometimes added to the mix. It is commonly garnished with crema, crumbled queso fresco, sliced onion, and avocado slices. Chilaquiles can be served with refried beans, eggs (scrambled or fried) and guacamole as side dishes.

As with many Mexican dishes, regional and family variations are quite common. Usually, chilaquiles are eaten at breakfast or brunch. This makes them a popular recipe to use leftover tortillas and salsas.

Etymology

Regional variations 

In central Mexico, it is common for the tortilla chips to remain crisp. To achieve this, all ingredients except the salsa are placed on a plate and the salsa is poured at the last moment before serving. In Guadalajara, cazuelas are kept simmering filled with chilaquiles that become thick in texture, similar to polenta. In the state of Sinaloa, chilaquiles are sometimes prepared with cream. In the state of Tamaulipas, on the northeast side of the country, red tomato sauce is commonly used.

History in the United States 
Recipes for chilaquiles have been found in a U.S. cookbook published in 1898, Encarnación Pinedo's El cocinero español (The Spanish Cook). She included three recipes—one for chilaquiles tapatios a la mexicana, one for chilaquiles a la mexicana, and one for chilaquiles con camarones secos (chilaquiles with dry shrimp).

See also 
 List of Mexican dishes
 List of brunch foods
 List of tortilla-based dishes
 Migas

Footnotes

References

Mexican cuisine
Tortilla-based dishes